Navrachana University is a Private University located in Vadodara, Gujarat. It was created by the state of Gujarat under the Private University Act, 2009.

Schools 
School of Liberal Studies and Education offers: BA-Journalism & Mass Communication, BA-Humanities and Social Sciences, BEd and PhD.

School of Science offers: BSc(Chemistry, Biochemistry, Life Sciences, Microbiology), BSc-MSc Integrated(Biomedical), MSc(Chemistry), MSc(Microbiology), MSc(Life Science) and MSc(Biotechnology).

School of Environmental Design and Architecture offers: Bachelor of Architecture, Bachelor of Design (Interior/Landscape).

School of Engineering and Technology offers: BCA, BSc(Data Science), Bachelor of Technology (Mechanical, Electrical & Electronics, Civil and Computer Science and Engineering) and MTech (Master of Technology).

School of Business and Law offers: BBA, BBA-LLB, LLM, MBA and Executive MBA.

All Educational Programs follow modular, semester-wise curricula and allow taking courses that cut across program boundaries. The unitary character allows the university to innovate new educational and pedagogic models grounded in interdisciplinary thinking and capitalize on the shared infrastructural and educational resources to achieve a rich academic and life experience.

References

https://www.highereducationdigest.com/choice-based-curriculum-encourages-inter-multi-disciplinary-learning/

https://gujarati.news18.com/amp/news/madhya-gujarat/vadodara-navarachna-university-students-created-a-predictive-model-to-predict-lighting-events-vnd-local18-1320893.html

https://indiaeducationdiary.in/navrachana-universitys-khoj-winter-school-exhibition-inaugurated/

https://curriculum-magazine.com/navrachana-universitys-khoj-winter-school-exhibition-till-jan-20/

https://online.pubhtml5.com/jlyo/bxvr/#p=1

External links
Official website

Private universities in India
Universities in Gujarat
Universities and colleges in Vadodara
2009 establishments in Gujarat
Educational institutions established in 2009